Wetherell is an English surname, and may refer to:

Sir Charles Wetherell (1770–1846), English lawyer, politician and judge
Chris Wetherell, musician in American rock bands Dealership and Citizens Here and Abroad
Elizabeth Wetherell, pen name of Susan Warner (1819–1885),  American evangelical writer
Ernest Wetherell (1893–1969), Australian politician
Frank E. Wetherell, American architect
Gordon Wetherell (born 1948), British diplomat, governor of the Turks and Caicos Islands
Henry Wetherell (1775–1857), British Anglican priest, Archdeacon of Hereford
Ian Colin Wetherell, birth name of Ian Colin (1910–1987), British film and television actor
Joe Wetherell (1880–unknown), English footballer
Manoli Wetherell, New York Bureau Chief Engineer for National Public Radio
Margaret Wetherell, British discourse analyst
Marmaduke Wetherell (1884–1939), British–South African actor, screenwriter and film director
Marmaduke Wetherell, British big-game hunter alleged to have committed a Loch Ness Monster hoax
Nathan Wetherell (1726–1808), Vice-Chancellor of the University of Oxford
Nathan Wetherell (cricketer) (1808–1887), English amateur cricketer
Nathaniel Wetherell (1800–1875), British geologist and surgeon
T. Kent Wetherell II (born 1970), American judge
T. K. Wetherell (1945-2018), American educational administrator and politician
Virginia Bass Wetherell (born 1947), American businesswoman and politician
Virginia Wetherell (born 1943), English actress
Walter D. Wetherell (born 1948), American writer
Steven Wetherell, English writer

See also
Weatherall
Wetherall
Wetherill